The Jockeys' Guild Inc. is an American trade association based in Lexington, Kentucky, representing thoroughbred horse racing and American quarter horse professional jockeys.  The organization filed for Chapter 11 protection from creditors in bankruptcy court in Louisville, Kentucky, on October 12, 2007.

Established in 1940, the organization's founding members consisted of many of the leading jockeys of the day including Eddie Arcaro, Carroll Bierman, Charley Kurtsinger, Johnny Longden, Don Meade, Maurice Peters, Red Pollard, Sam Renick, Harry Richards, Alfred Robertson, and Ray Workman.

The Jockeys' Guild founding board was made up of:
 Harry Richards - President
 Lester Balaski - 1st Vice President
 Eddie Arcaro - 2nd Vice President
 Raymond Workman - 3rd Vice President
 Irving Anderson - Treasurer

On February 24, 2001, the Thoroughbred Times published an article captioned 'A debt of remembrance', that told the story of the important work by jockey Tommy Luther, that led to the Guild's creation. The story recounted the influence on Luther, when he was part of the horrific circumstances North American jockeys lived under at the time; fellow jockey Earl "Sandy" Graham was killed while racing at Polo Park Racetrack in Winnipeg, Manitoba in September 1927.

Presidents
Harry Richards: 1940-1943
Sterling Young: 1943-1949
Eddie Arcaro: 1949-1962
Sam Boulmetis: 1962-1967
William Boland: 1967-1969
Walter Blum: 1969-1975
Mike Venezia: 1975-1981
Bill Shoemaker: 1981-1989
Jerry D. Bailey: 1989-1996
Gary Stevens: 1996-2000
Pat Day: 2000-2001
Tomey Jean Swan: 2001 (Acting)
L. Wayne Gertmenian: 2001-2005
Darrell Haire: 2005-2006 (Acting)
Dwight Manley: 2006-2007
John R. Velazquez: 2007–present

L. Wayne Gertmenian

L. Wayne Gertmenian  is a professor of economics at Pepperdine University's Graziadio School of Business and Management.

Gertmenian is known for being sued for fraud by the Jockeys' Guild after being ousted as president. The Jockeys' Guild alleged in a civil lawsuit filed that Gertmenian used his consulting firm and another company owned by a family member to embezzle funds from the labor organization's members and the guild health-care plan.

A U.S. House of Representatives subcommittee looking at jockey health and welfare issues was sharply critical of Gertmenian's management of the Jockeys' Guild. Congress had concerns about Gertmenian himself, and his tendency to embellish. Gertmenian's resume includes references that he was chief détente negotiator in the Nixon and Ford administrations, references that could not be confirmed by Congress or the Department of Defense.

Gertmenian also recorded the audio program "Everything's Negotiable".

References

External links
Jockeys' Guild website

Horse racing organizations in the United States
Trade unions in the United States
Trade unions established in 1940
Sports trade unions of the United States